The United States cricket team toured the United Arab Emirates in March 2019 to play two Twenty20 International (T20I) matches ahead of the 2019 ICC World Cricket League Division Two tournament. They were the first T20I fixtures to be played by the United States, and their first full international matches since the 2004 ICC Champions Trophy.

The United States named their team on 28 February 2019, with Saurabh Netravalkar, who had previously played for Mumbai in the Ranji Trophy in India, captaining the side. Xavier Marshall was also named in the United States' squad, having previously played 37 international matches for the West Indies cricket team.

The United Arab Emirates retained Mohammad Naveed as the captain of the team, after their regular captain, Rohan Mustafa, had previously been suspended. Mustafa returned to the squad, along with Ahmed Raza and Rameez Shahzad, who had also previously been suspended.

The United Arab Emirates won the T20I series 1–0, after the first game finished as a no result due to rain.

Following the T20I matches, the United States played seven 50-over matches against the UAE, a UAE XI team and Lancashire County Cricket Club. The latter match was the first fixture between the two teams. It was also the first time an American cricket team had played Lancashire since the Philadelphian cricket team toured England in 1903, when they played at Old Trafford. The United States won six of the seven 50-over matches, which included two wins against the full UAE national team.

Squads

T20I series

1st T20I

2nd T20I

50-over series

1st match

2nd match

3rd match

4th match

5th match

6th match

7th match

References

External links
 Series home at ESPN Cricinfo

2019 in American cricket
2019 in Emirati cricket
International cricket competitions in 2018–19